Merryn Rosemary Somerset Webb (born 23 June 1970), is a Senior Columnist at Bloomberg writing about wealth, investing and personal finance and is a radio and television commentator on financial matters.

Life and career 
She attended Wycombe Abbey, a boarding school in the UK. After gaining a first class degree in History & Economics as a senior scholar at Gonville and Caius College, Cambridge, Webb was awarded a Daiwa scholarship and spent a year studying for a master's degree in Japanese language at the University of London's School of Oriental and African Studies. In 1992, she moved to Japan to continue her Japanese studies and to produce business programmes for NHK, Japan's public television station.

In 1993, she became an institutional broker for SBC Warburg in Tokyo, where she stayed for five years. Returning to London in 1998, to work for BNP Paribas, she later became a financial writer for The Week. Two years later, in 2000, she took on the role of launch editor for the financial weekly MoneyWeek.

In 2007 she wrote her first book Love is Not Enough, a personal finance book aimed at women. In 2011 she co-presented Superscrimpers for Channel 4.

In 2013, Webb was awarded an honorary doctorate in Business Administration from BPP University for her contribution to financial journalism.

Webb is a non-executive director of two investment trusts; the Baillie Gifford Shin Nippon Trust and the Montanaro European Smaller Companies Trust.

In 2022 Webb published her second book Share Power,

In 2022 she became a Senior Columnist at Bloomberg writing about wealth, investing and personal finance.

Awards 

Webb has won multiple awards for her journalism, including;

 Harold Wincott Award winner – Personal Finance Journalist of the Year 2008

 Harold Wincott Award winner – Personal Finance Journalist of the Year 2018, for her Saturday column in FT Money.

 CFA UK Financial Journalism Award winner 

 Ethical and Professional Standards Award 2016

 Headline Money Awards winner – Financial Commentator of the Year 2019

Bibliography

References

External links 

Alumni of Gonville and Caius College, Cambridge
Alumni of SOAS University of London
British journalists
British magazine editors
British columnists
Living people
1970 births